Exercise equipment is any apparatus or device used during physical activity to enhance the strength or conditioning effects of that exercise by providing either fixed or adjustable amounts of resistance, or to otherwise enhance the experience or outcome of an exercise routine.

Exercise equipment may also include such wearable items as proper footgear, gloves, and hydration packs.

General strength training equipment

A broad range of different types of exercise equipment are available, including:
Free-weight training:
Preloaded dumbbells and conventional dumbbells
Kettlebells
Preloaded barbells and conventional barbells
Weight plates: bumper plates, steel plates, micro-plates
Collars
Weight machines
Cables
Rowers
Head/neck harness
Variable resistance training:
Elastic bands (resistance bands): monster bands, hip circles, floss bands, mini bands
Chain accommodation training: chains
Lifting accessories:
Straps, wraps and sleeves:
Lifting wrist straps
Wrist wraps
Elbow sleeves
Knee wraps
Knee sleeves
Grip: Gym chalk, gloves (the use of gloves during weight training is controversial. Some believe gloves improve grip, while others believe the extra material between the skin and bar worsens grip. In either case, grip strength must be trained to improve performance.)
Sling shots
Shoes (specifically made for Olympic weightlifting, squats, deadlifts, overhead press, etc.)
Belts (10 mm, 13 mm; small, medium, large; prong belts, lever belts)
kBox flywheel training devices

Strongman (strength athlete) equipment 

Yokes
Training sleds: sleds, push sleds, pull sleds
Logs
Axles
Farmer's walk handles
Stones: Atlas stones, stones of steel
Kegs
General grip strength: Captains of Crush Grippers, wrist rollers, Fat Gripz, pinch blocks, pull-up spheres
Power pins, loading pins
Hammers, slammers, maces, clubs
Sandbags
Bulgarian bags

Bodyweight training, calisthenics & gymnastics equipment 

Parallel bars (P-bars): high P-bars, low P-bars
Pulling-related:
Pull-up/dip belts
Peg boards
Pull-up bars:
Free standing bar
Wall-mounted
Ceiling-mounted
Doorway (use leverage around door frame)
Extending door frame (extends out to fit between door frame)
Weights:
Weighted vest
Ankle weights
Wrist weights
Exercise balls:
Medicine ball
Swiss exercise ball
Rope:
Jump rope
Rope climbing
Agility ladder
Battling ropes
Climbing rope
Suspension training:

TRX System
Gymnastic rings
 Training sleds
 Resistance bands
 Power tower
 Push-up handle bars
 Parallettes
 Wall bars
 Plyo Box

Myofascial release and recovery tools
Rolling: foam roller, RumbleRoller, GRID STK foam roller
Balls: lacrosse ball, spiky, dimple, rad roller or peanuts

Other 

 Elliptical trainer
 StreetStrider, an elliptical trainer on wheels
 Stepper, also known as mini stepper or stair stepper
 Stair machine, also known as stair stepper
 Stationary bicycle
 Training masks
 Treadmill
 Glute Ham Developers (GHD) for developing glutes and hamstrings

See also 
 Outdoor gym
 Exercise machine
 Fitness (biology)
 Physical exercise
 Weight training
 Hojo undō, conditioning exercises used in martial arts

References